is a town located in Ito District, Wakayama Prefecture, Japan. , the town had an estimated population of 16,170 in 7137 households and a population density of 110 persons per km². The town was named after the nearby Katsuragi Mountains.

Geography
Katsuragi is long and narrow from north to south, and is located in the northeastern part of Wakayama prefecture. The Kinokawa River flows from east to west in the former Katsuragi Town area, and the Kishi River flows from east to west in the Shinshiro area at the southernmost tip of the former Katsuragi Town. In addition, the Arita River runs through the former Hanazono village area. The terrain is sandwiched between the Kii Mountains and the Izumi Mountains, forming a basin.

Neighboring municipalities
Wakayama Prefecture
Hashimoto
Kinokawa
Kudoyama
Kōya
 Kimino
Aridagawa
Osaka Prefecture
Kawachinagano
Izumi
Kishiwada
Nara Prefecture
Nosegawa

Climate
Katsuragi has a Humid subtropical climate (Köppen Cfa) characterized by warm summers and cool winters with light to no snowfall.  The average annual temperature in Katsuragi is 13.7 °C. The average annual rainfall is 1771 mm with September as the wettest month. The temperatures are highest on average in August, at around 25.4 °C, and lowest in January, at around 2.3 °C. The area is subject to typhoons in summer.

Demographics
Per Japanese census data, the population of Katsuragi has decreased steadily over the past 70 years.

History
The town of Katsuragi was founded by the merger of the town of Ito and Myōji and the village of Miyoshi (all from Ito District) on July 1, 1958. On October 1, 2005 the village of Hanazono, from Ito District, was merged into Katsuragi.

Government
Katsuragi has a mayor-council form of government with a directly elected mayor and a unicameral town council of 14 members. Katsuragi, collectively with the other municipalities of Ito District contributes one member to the Wakayama Prefectural Assembly. In terms of national politics, the town is part of Wakayama 2nd district of the lower house of the Diet of Japan.

Economy
Katsuragi is one of the largest agricultural areas in Wakayama, and agriculture, horticulture and food processing dominate the local economy.

Education
Katsuragi has five public elementary schools and two public middle schools operated by the town government and two public high schools operated by the Wakayama Prefectural Department of Education.

Transportation

Railway
 JR West – Wakayama Line
  -   -   -  -

Highway
  Keinawa Expressway

Local attractions 
Niutsuhime Shrine,  National Historic Site and World Heritage Site
Kōyasan chōishi-michi,  National Historic Site and World Heritage Site

Notable people from Katsuragi
Hirofumi Hirano, politician
Nenji Kobayashi, actor

References

External links

Katsuragi official website 

Katsuragi, Wakayama
Towns in Wakayama Prefecture